Saurabh Passi (born 6 October 1989) is an Indian former cricketer. He played one Twenty20 cricket match for Delhi in 2014.

See also
 List of Delhi cricketers

References

External links
 

1989 births
Living people
Indian cricketers
Delhi cricketers
Cricketers from Delhi